The little rainbow wrasse (Dotalabrus alleni) is a species of marine ray-finned fish which is classified within the wrasse family Labridae. The specific name honours Dr. Gerald R. Allen who collected the holotype and a number of paratypes, and the brought Barry Russell's attention to this taxon so that he could describe it.

References

Little rainbow wrasse
Taxa named by Barry C. Russell
Fish described in 1988